Glenwood is an unincorporated community in Whitman County, Washington, United States.

The community was named for the glen and woods near the original town site.

References

Unincorporated communities in Whitman County, Washington
Unincorporated communities in Washington (state)